Philip Wilkes Bell (1924–2007) was an American accounting scholar and professor of accounting, known for seeking "to bring accounting and economics closer together."

Biography 
Bell was born in 1924 in New York City to Samuel D. Bell and Miriam Wilkes Bell. He obtained his BA in economics from Princeton University in 1947, his MA in economics from University of California, Berkeley in 1949, and back at Princeton his PhD in international economics in 1954 under guidance of Jacob Viner with the thesis, entitled "The Sterling Area in the Post-War World."

In World War II Bell had served as pilot in the U.S. Air Force, and back in the States he was correspondent for The New York Times in the year 1946–1947. In 1952 he started his academic career as assistant professor in economics at Haverford College. After other academic positions in economics at the University of California, Berkeley and Boston University, in 1978 he was appointed William Alexander Kirkland Professor of Accounting and Economics at Rice University.

Bell developed his interest in international economics, especially international financial flows, development economics and economic development. He was consultant for the U.S. Departments of Treasury and State, the U. S. Agency for International Development, and among others for the Kenyan government. He was inducted into the Accounting Hall of Fame in 2003.

Selected publications 
 Edgar O Edwards and Bell, Philip W. The theory and measurement of business income. Univ of California Press, 1961.
 Edwards, Edgar O., Philip W. Bell, and L. Todd Johnson. Accounting for economic events. Scholars Book Company, 1979.

Articles, a selection:
 Bell, Philip W. "Private capital movements and the US balance of payments position." Factors affecting the United States balance of payments (1962): 395–481.

References

External links 
 Philip W. Bell, The Accounting Hall of Fame.

1924 births
2007 deaths
American accountants
American business theorists
Accounting academics
Princeton University alumni
UC Berkeley College of Letters and Science alumni
Haverford College faculty
University of California, Berkeley College of Letters and Science faculty
Boston University faculty
Rice University faculty
Educators from New York City